Ghazaleh "Mona" Heydari (24 December 2004 – 5 February 2022) was an Iranian teenage girl who was beheaded in Ahvaz, Iran in a honour killing by her husband. Pictures and videos of her husband, Sajjad Heydari, smiling while carrying her head, caused widespread outrage in Iran. In the aftermath of the beheading, her husband and his brother-in-law were arrested by Iranian police.

Background

Mona Heydari was married to Sajjad Heydari, at the age of 12. She fled to Turkey to escape her husband's domestic abuse against her. She was brought back to Iran by her close relatives.

She had a child, aged 3. She gave birth to him when she was 14.

Incident 
She was beheaded by her husband and his brother-in-law in a house. Her body was dumped.

Aftermath 
Human Rights Watch condemned the murder, calling for reforming a draft law that would criminalize violence against women.

Human rights activists in Iran made a petition on Daadkhast, an Iranian-based petition website, to stop killings in Iran. The petition gathered over 1,500 signatures.

Perpetrator 
The Iranian government shut down Rokna News Agency, an Iranian news website, for displaying an image of Sajjad Heydari holding a knife in one hand, and her head in another. The reason for shutting down Rokna because of "publishing images and issues that violate public decency".

On 18 January 2023, Sajjad Heydari was sentenced to more than 8 years in prison for the decapitation of his wife, and the public display of her head. The charges include murder and assault, as told by judiciary spokesman Massoud Setayeshi to reporters.

See also 
 Killing of Tiba al-Ali
 Murder of Romina Ashrafi
 List of honor killings in Iran

References 

2022 murders in Iran
Deaths by decapitation
Deaths by person in Iran
February 2022 crimes in Asia
February 2022 events in Iran
Female murder victims
Honor killing in Asia
Honor killing victims
Uxoricides
Violence against women in Iran